Level 5, Level-5, Level Five, or Level V may refer to:

Gradings
Level 5, the lowest level of capability for a US trauma center (see Trauma center#Level V)
Level 5, the highest level of automation in a self-driving car (see Autonomous car#Classification)
Level 5, the highest level of security in US federal prisons (see Incarceration in the United States#Security levels) 
Level 5, a level of spiritual development in Theosophy (see Initiation (Theosophy)#Fifth initiation)
Level 5, a gradation in English rugby union system#Level 5
Level 5, a gradation in English football league system#Promotion and relegation rules for the top eight levels
Level 5, a gradation in German football league system#Regional association league systems

Other
Level Five (film), a 1997 French art film by Chris Marker
Level-5 (company), a Japanese video game company founded in 1998
Level5 Stadium, a stadium in Fukuoka, with naming rights held by the Japanese video game company
Level Five (EP), a 2001 EP by King Crimson
"Level Five", a song by King Crimson
Level 5 Motorsports, an American racing team founded in 2006
 STANAG 4569 protection level